Franklin Williams may refer to:

Franklin Delano Williams (1947–1993), American Gospel music singer
Franklin Williams (diplomat) (1917–1990), lawyer and civil rights leader in the United States

See also
Frank Williams (disambiguation)